The Congress of Union of Employees in the Public and Civil Services Malaysia, abbreviated CUEPACS, is a national trade union centre in Malaysia. It has a membership of 1,200,000.

Current leadership

 President
 Azih Muda
 Deputy President
 Zainal Ismail
 Mohd Shaman Jaes
 Secretary General
 Adnan Mat
 Deputy Secretary General
 Abdul Rahman Mohd Nordin
 Zainal Ghafar
 Hary Tan Huat
 Financial Secretary
 Ja'apar Mansor
 Deputy Financial Secretary
 Mohd Razali Singah

Affiliated
Peninsular Malaysia Customs Officers Union, or Kesatuan Pegawai Kastam Semenanjung Malaysia (KPHKSM)
Kesatuan Penyediaan Makanan Hospital Semenanjung Malaysia
Kesatuan Pembantu Perangkaan Kerajaan Semenanjung Malaysia
Amalgamated Union of Employees in Government Clerical and Allied Services
Kesatuan Kakitangan Lembaga Tabung Angkatan Tentera
Kesatuan Pegawai-pegawai Hutan Melayu Semenanjung Malaysia
Kesatuan Pekerja-pekerja Perbadanan Kemajuan Negeri Selangor
Kesatuan Pekerja Bomba dan Penyelamat Semenanjung Malaysia
Kesatuan Pekerja-pekerja Jabatan Perhilitan Semenanjung Malaysia
Kesatuan Kakitangan Am Pusat Perubatan Universiti Malaya
Kesatuan Kakitangan Perkhidmatan Tadbir dan Awam Pasukan Polis Semenanjung Malaysia
Sarawak Medical Services Union
Kesatuan Pegawai-pegawai Kastam Sarawak
Kesatuan Juruteknologi Pergigian Malaysia
Kesatuan Pembantu Pembedahan Pergigian Semenanjung Malaysia
Kesatuan Perkhidmatan Teknik Semenanjung Malaysia
Kesatuan Kakitangan Lembaga Kemajuan Pertanian Kemubu
Malayan Nurses Union (MNU), or Kesatuan Jururawat Malaya
Kesatuan Pembantu Pertanian Semenanjung Malaysia
Kesatuan Pekerja Rendah Awam Kerajaan Negeri Perak Darul Ridzuan
Kesatuan Pekerja-pekerja Perdananan Kemajuan Negeri, Negeri Sembilan
Kesatuan Pekerja-pekerja Majlis Bandaraya Melaka Bersejarah
Kesatuan Pekerja-pekerja Lembaga Kemajuan Tanah Persekutuan (FELDA)
Kesatuan Kakitangan Am Universiti Teknologi Malaysia
Kesatuan Perkhidmatan Perkeranian Kerajaan Kelantan
Kesatuan Kakitangan Am Universiti Putra Malaysia
Kesatuan Penyelia Asrama Kementerian Kesihatan Semenanjung Malaysia
Kesatuan Pekerja-pekerja Kuasa-kuasa Tempatan Negeri Perak
Kesatuan Pegawai-pegawai Majlis Amanah Rakyat (MARA)
Persatuan Pegawai-pegawai Perkhidmatan Perhubungan Perusahaan Kementerian Sumber Manusia
Kesatuan Pegawai Kanan Pihak Berkuasa Kemajuan Pekebun Kecil Perusahaan Getah (RISDA)
Kesatuan Kakitangan Umum Universiti Teknologi MARA
Kesatuan Kebangsaan Pembantu Perawatan Kesihatan Semenanjung Malaysia
Kesatuan Kakitangan Lembaga Pemasaran Pertanian Persekutuan (FAMA)
Kesatuan Kebangsaan Kakitangan Majlis Amanah Rakyat (MARA)
Kesatuan Pembantu Veterinar Semenanjung Malaysia
Kesatuan Pekerja-pekerja Lembaga Kemajuan Pertanian Muda (MADA)
Kesatuan Pekerja-pekerja Keretapi Negeri Sabah
Kesatuan Pekerja-pekerja Awam Angkatan Tentera Malaysia
Kesatuan Buruh Majlis Bandaraya Pulau Pinang
Kesatuan Kakitangan Jabatan Pertanian Sarawak
Kesatuan Penolong Pegawai Penyediaan Makanan Kementerian Kesihatan Semenanjung Malaysia
Kesatuan Penolong Pegawai Kesihatan Persekitaran Sabah
Kesatuan Sekerja Kakitangan Majlis Agama Islam Kelantan
Kesatuan Kakitangan Am Institut Penyelidikan Dan Kemajuan Pertanian Malaysia (MARDI) Malaysia
Kesatuan Pembantu Tadbir Kesihatan Semenanjung Malaysia
Kesatuan Kebangsaan Pekerja-pekerja Jabatan Kerja Raya dan Air
Kesatuan Sekerja Kakitangan Makmal Kementerian Pendidikan Semenanjung Malaysia
Kesatuan Kebangsaan Pekerja-pekerja Pihak Berkuasa Tempatan Semenanjung Malaysia
Kesatuan Perkhidmatan Perguruan Kebangsaan Semenanjung Malaysia
Kesatuan Perkhidmatan Perubatan Sabah, or Sabah Medical Services Union (SMSU)
Kesatuan Pekerja-pekerja Kerajaan Kedah
Kesatuan Bidan-bidan dan Jururawat Desa Kerajaan Semenanjung Malaysia
Kesatuan Penyelenggara Setor Kerajaan
Kesatuan Pegawai Pengangkutan Jalan Semenanjung Malaysia
Persatuan Pengajar Jururawat Semenanjung Malaysia
Kesatuan Pekerja-pekerja Lembaga Getah Malaysia
Kesatuan Pekerja-pekerja Kerajaan Negeri Kelantan
Kesatuan Pembantu Operasi Perkhidmatan Awam Semenanjung Malaysia
Kesatuan Pekerja-pekerja Jabatan Kebajikan Masyarakat Malaysia Semenanjung Malaysia
Kesatuan Pekerja-pekerja Pihak Berkuasa Kemajuan Pekebun Kecil Perusahaan Getah (RISDA) Semenanjung Malaysia
Kesatuan Pekerja-pekerja Kerajaan Negeri Melaka
Kesatuan Inspektor Kesihatan Semenanjung Malaysia
Kesatuan Pekerja-pekerja Pengangkutan Majlis Amanah Rakyat (MARA) Malaysia Barat
Kesatuan Kakitangan Am Universiti Sains Malaysia
Kesatuan Pekerja-pekerja Lembaga Air Perak Darul Ridzuan
Kesatuan Kakitangan Pertubuhan Keselamatan Sosial
Kesatuan Kakitangan Perbadanan Pembangunan Pelaburan Malaysia (MIDA)
Kesatuan Pegawai-pegawai Penguatkuasa Kementerian Perdagangan Dalam Negeri dan Hal Ehwal Pengguna Malaysia
Kesatuan Kakitangan Universiti Utara Malaysia
Kesatuan Pegawai Eksekutif
Kesatuan Kakitangan Akademik Universiti Teknologi MARA
Kesatuan Pemandu-pemandu Kementerian Kesihatan Semenanjung Malaysia
Kesatuan Pembantu Tadbir dan Pembantu Tadbir Rendah (Pendidikan) Semenanjung Malaysia
Kesatuan Jurubahasa-jurubahasa dan Penterjemah-penterjemah Kementerian Kehakiman Malaysia Barat
Kesatuan Kakitangan Am Lembaga Minyak Sawit Malaysia
Kesatuan Pekerja-pekerja Kerajaan Negeri Johor
Kesatuan Pegawai Eksekutif Lembaga Pemasaran Pertanian Persekutuan (FAMA)
Kesatuan Penolong Pegawai Pembangunan Masyarakat dan Pembantu Pembangunan Masyarakat Jabatan Perpaduan Negara dan Integriti Nasional Semenanjung Malaysia
Kesatuan Kakitangan Lembaga Tabung Haji
Sarawak Government Dental Employees' Union
Kesatuan Pekerja-pekerja Kumpulan Perusahaan dan Buruh Kasar Majlis Bandaraya Perbandaran dan Daerah Bahagian Kuching dan Samarahan
Kesatuan Pekerja Awam Kementerian Pertahanan Malaysia (KESATRIA Sarawak)
Kesatuan Pekerja-pekerja Gaji Hari dan IMG JKR Sarawak
Kesatuan Kakitangan Awam Polis Sarawak (SPOCSU)
Kesatuan Guru-guru Bumiputera Sarawak
Sibu Water Board Employees Union
Kesatuan Pekerja-pekerja Majlis Bandaraya Miri
Kesatuan Pembantu Makmal (Pelajaran) Negeri Sarawak (KESPEMS)
Kesatuan Sekerja Kakitangan Majlis Perbandaran Tawau
Kesatuan Pekerja-pekerja Jabatan Air Sabah
Kesatuan Sekerja Jabatan Laut Sabah
Kesatuan Sekerja Kastam Diraja Sabah
Kesatuan Pekerja-pekerja Jabatan Kerja Raya Sabah
Kesatuan Guru-guru Kerajaan Sabah
Kesatuan Juruteknik Jabatan Kerja Raya Sabah
Kesatuan Perkhidmatan Perbandaran Pulau Pinang
Kesatuan Pekerja Dewan Bandaraya Kuala Lumpur
Kesatuan Pekerja-pekerja Rendah Awam Pihak Berkuasa Tempatan Negeri Johor
Kesatuan Pekerja-pekerja Jabatan Pertanian Sabah
Kesatuan Perkhidmatan Kawalan Vektor Semenanjung Malaysia
Kesatuan Kakitangan Jabatan Hal Ehwal Orang Asli Semenanjung Malaysia
Kesatuan Anggota-anggota Jabatan Penerangan
Kesatuan Kakitangan Am Universiti Sains Malaysia
Kesatuan Kakitangan Am Universiti Kebangsaan Malaysia (KESUKMA)Kesatuan Kakitangan Am Universiti Malaya''

See also

Trade unions in Malaysia

References

External links

Trade unions in Malaysia
Trade unions established in 1957